The 1978 European Curling Championships were held from December 4 to 9 at the Aviemore Ice Rink in Aviemore, Scotland.

The Swiss men's team won their second European title, and the Swedish women's team won their third European title.

Men's

Teams

Round robin

  Team to final
  Teams to semifinal

Playoffs

Final standings

Women's

Teams

Round robin

  Team to final
  Teams to semifinal

Playoffs

Final standings

References

European Curling Championships, 1978
European Curling Championships, 1978
European Curling Championships
Curling competitions in Scotland
International sports competitions hosted by Scotland
European Curling Championships
European Curling Championships
Aviemore
Sport in Highland (council area)